Richarlyson Barbosa Felisbino, simply Richarlyson (born 27 December 1982), is a Brazilian former professional footballer. Mainly a defensive midfielder, he can also play as a left back or central defender. He currently works as a pundit for SporTV.

Career
Richarlyson made his footballing debut at Itu's Ituano FC youth squad, where he won the Copa São Paulo de Juniores. "Ricky" then moved on to EC Santo André, a club from the ABC region in Greater São Paulo which his father, the former footballer Lela, has also defended during his playing career. Loaned to Ceará side Fortaleza EC and Austrian top flight club Salzburg, the midfielder drew the attention of São Paulo city giants SE Palmeiras. Concerns about a possible change of his nickname – from his first name, Richarlyson, to his last name, Felisbino – due to the relatively complicated pronounce and spelling, upon Palmeiras' request, made Richarlyson uneasy about joining the club, which culminated in a last-minute decision to instead move to São Paulo FC, one of Palmeiras' rivals.

A court battle between São Paulo and Santo André delayed his debut for the Morumbi club, even after both clubs have reached a settlement. With few opportunities in the main squad, Richarlyson languished until the hiring of the coach Muricy Ramalho. Under the command of Ramalho, Richarlyson went on to have the best phase of his career as a footballer, being an integral part of São Paulo's three Campeonato Brasileiro championships in a row. At the peak of his career, Richarlyson was called by the Brazil national football team's coach Dunga for their friendly against Republic of Ireland. The former captain of the Seleção greatly praised Ricky's versatility and ability to play for various positions and different roles on the pitch. Richarlyson, despite his success for the club, was a target of constant scrutiny and abuse over allegations of homosexuality, to the point where even São Paulo supporters would sing demeaning and homophobic chants against him.

After a long spell at São Paulo, however, his form seemed to worsen. Becoming increasingly reckless, Richarlyson was sent off in important matches, such as the Copa Libertadores fixture against Universitario de Deportes, and a match against Fluminense FC, when he called the match referee a "son of a bitch", telling him to "go fuck himself", and then ending his rant by stating that the referee "besides it all, he's [also] a faggot" in a burst of anger when leaving the field. The constant sending-offs, alongside a lack of technical quality, have forced São Paulo to negotiate the midfielder.

Atlético Mineiro, from Belo Horizonte, looking for reinforcements, signed the player, as the year's "top signing" for the team. A constant presence in the starting eleven, Ricky achieved success with the Champions of the Ice, winning the 2012 Campeonato Mineiro and making a stellar campaign in the 2012 Campeonato Brasileiro Série A, taking the Galo to the 2013 Copa Libertadores after a 13-year absence from the competition. In 2013, Richarlyson was joined by his brother, the forward Alecsandro, being the first time the two brothers have played together for the same team.

In December 2014, Richarlyson confirmed his retirement from football. The decision was made after the relegation of his latest club, Esporte Clube Vitória, for Campeonato Brasileiro Série B. On 27 January 2015, however, he stepped back from retirement and signed for Chapecoense.

Personal life
In 2022, Richarlyson came out as bisexual in an interview with the podcast Nos Armários dos Vestiários. This made him the first openly LGBT player to have played for the Brazilian men's national team and in the Campeonato Brasileiro Série A.

In 2023, he performed cosplayed as a ceramic water filter in the reality singing competition The Masked Singer Brasil.

Defamation grounded on his sexuality
On 25 June 2007, the newspaper Agora São Paulo reported that a football player of a major team would come out of the closet as a homosexual in an exclusive interview for the weekly newsmagazine Fantástico. The following day, Brazilian sports commentator Milton Neves invited the director of Palmeiras football club José Cyrillo Júnior for his live TV show Debate Bola. During the show, Neves asked Cyrillo Jr. if the player who was coming out was from his team. Cyrillo Jr. answered that "Richarlyson was almost taken by Palmeiras". Despite the public and the press overall seeing this as a potential give-away, the player did not comment on the case. The fact that Richarlyson turned down an offer from Palmeiras in the last minute, just before signing for rival São Paulo, put him in loggerheads with former Palmeiras director of football Salvador Hugo Palaia, which raised speculations about the team being homophobic. The rumors proved to be false later.
 
Richarlyson's attorney, Renato Salge, filed a lawsuit against Cyrillo Jr. for damages and defamation. Judge Manoel Maximiano Junqueira Filho dismissed the lawsuit and justified his decision by stating that football is a "virile, masculine sport and not a homosexual one" and that, on those grounds, "Richarlyson should be forever banished by FIFA and never be allowed to play football again". He suggested that a homosexual player should leave the team or start one of his own. After this ruling, the judge was given fifteen days to explain himself to the Justice Council of São Paulo and was also taken to court by Salge.

Career statistics

International

Honours
Santo André
 Copa do Brasil: 2004São Paulo Campeonato Brasileiro Série A: 2006, 2007, 2008
 FIFA Club World Cup: 2005Atlético Mineiro Copa Libertadores: 2013
 Campeonato Mineiro: 2012, 2013Individual'''
 Campeonato Brasileiro Série A Team of the Year: 2007
 Bola de Prata: 2007

External links

 globoesporte.globo.com
 Richarlyson at Footballdatabase
 sambafoot

References

1982 births
Living people
People from Natal, Rio Grande do Norte
Association football midfielders
Brazilian footballers
Brazilian expatriate footballers
Expatriate footballers in Austria
Expatriate footballers in India
Brazil international footballers
Campeonato Brasileiro Série A players
Campeonato Brasileiro Série B players
Campeonato Brasileiro Série C players
Campeonato Brasileiro Série D players
Esporte Clube Santo André players
Fortaleza Esporte Clube players
FC Red Bull Salzburg players
São Paulo FC players
Clube Atlético Mineiro players
Esporte Clube Vitória players
Copa Libertadores-winning players
Associação Chapecoense de Futebol players
Grêmio Novorizontino players
FC Goa players
Guarani FC players
Cianorte Futebol Clube players
Esporte Clube Noroeste players
Campinense Clube players
America Football Club (Rio de Janeiro) players
Sportspeople from Rio Grande do Norte
LGBT association football players
Brazilian LGBT sportspeople
Bisexual men
Bisexual sportspeople
21st-century LGBT people
Brazilian bisexual people